Augusta of Saxe-Weimar-Eisenach (Augusta Marie Luise Katharina; 30 September 1811 – 7 January 1890) was Queen of Prussia and the first German Empress as the wife of Wilhelm I, German Emperor.

Early life 
Augusta was the second daughter of Charles Frederick, Grand Duke of Saxe-Weimar-Eisenach, and Maria Pavlovna of Russia, a daughter of Paul I of Russia and  Sophie Dorothea of Württemberg.

While her father was an intellectually limited person, whose preferred reading up to the end of his life was fairy tales, Johann Wolfgang von Goethe spoke of Augusta's mother Marie as "one of the best and most significant women of her time." Augusta received a comprehensive education, including drawing lessons from the court painter, Luise Seidler, as well as music lessons from the court bandmaster, Johann Nepomuk Hummel.

Meeting with Wilhelm
Augusta was only fifteen years old when, in 1826, she first met her future husband, Prince Wilhelm (William), who was more than fourteen years older than her. William thought the young Augusta had an "excellent personality," yet was less attractive than her older sister Marie, whom William's younger brother, Karl (Charles), had already married. Above all, it was William's father who pressed him to consider Augusta as a potential wife.

At this time, William was in love with the Polish Princess Elisa Radziwill. The Crown Prince at the time was William's elder brother, Crown Prince Friedrich Wilhelm (later King Frederick William IV). He and his wife Elisabeth Ludovika had been married three years and had no children. Although it was not anticipated that they would remain childless (which turned out to be the case), the court did expect that William, as heir presumptive to the throne, should make a dynastic marriage and produce further heirs.

King Frederick William III was indulgent of the relationship between his son William and Elisa, but the Prussian court had discovered that her ancestors had purchased their princely title from Emperor Maximilian I, and she was not deemed noble enough to marry a potential King of Prussia. Ironically, Crown Princess Elisabeth Ludovika, who as a Bavarian princess was considered to be of correct rank, counted both Bogusław Radziwiłł and Janusz Radziwiłł among her ancestors, albeit through female descent.

It was suggested by some courtiers that if Eliza Radziwill was adopted by a family of adequate rank, then a marriage with Prince William was possible. In 1824, the Prussians turned to the childless Alexander I of Russia to adopt Elisa, but the Russian Tsar declined. The second adoption plan by Elisa's uncle, Prince Augustus of Prussia, likewise failed because the responsible committee considered that adoption does not change "the blood." Another factor was the Mecklenburg relations of the deceased Queen Louise's influence in the German and Russian courts (she was not fond of Elisa's father).

Thus, in June 1826, William's father felt forced to demand the renunciation of a potential marriage to Elisa. Thus, William spent the next few months looking for a more suitable bride, but did not relinquish his emotional ties to Elisa. Eventually, William asked for Augusta's hand in marriage on 29 August (in writing and through the intervention of his father). Augusta agreed and on 25 October 1828, they were engaged.

Historian Karin Feuerstein-Prasser has pointed out on the basis of evaluations of the correspondence between both fiancées, what different expectations William had of both marriages: He wrote to his sister Charlotte, the wife of Nicholas I of Russia, with reference to Elisa Radziwill: "One can love only once in life, really" and confessed with regard to Augusta, that "the Princess is nice and clever, but she leaves me cold." Augusta liked her future husband and hoped for a happy marriage, in the end, it was an inwardly happy marriage despite outward appearances.

On 11 June 1829, William married his fiancée in the chapel of Schloss Charlottenburg.

Married life

The first weeks of marriage were harmonious; Augusta was taken favorably in the Prussian King's court, however, Augusta soon started to be bored with its military sobriety, and most courtly duties (which may have counteracted this boredom) were reserved to her sister-in-law, Crown Princess Elisabeth.

In a letter which William wrote on 22 January 1831 to his sister Charlotte, he has mixed feelings of his wife's "lack of femininity".  Prince Friedrich (later Emperor Frederick  III of Germany), was born later that year on 18 October 1831, three years after their marriage and  Louise, was born on 3 December 1838, seven years later.

Augusta as a politician
Augusta was very interested in politics. Like so many other liberally-minded people of the time, she was hopeful regarding the accession of Frederick William IV, her brother-in-law, who was regarded as a potentially modern and open king. However, he refused to grant a constitution to Prussia and led a far more conservative government than was expected from his liberal ideals during his years as the crown prince. A "united Landtag" was created by the King in reaction to the crop failures and hunger revolts of 1847, but was dissolved a few months later. Prince William was held responsible for the bloodshed of the March revolution in 1848, in Berlin and on the advice of the King, William fled to London, and Augusta and their two children withdrew to Potsdam.

In liberal circles, an idea was seriously discussed as to whether or not to force the King to abdicate, the Crown Prince renounce his rights to the throne, and instead have Augusta take up a regency for their son. Because the letters and diaries of that time were later destroyed by Augusta, it is not clear whether she seriously considered this option. After, in May 1848, 800 members of the German National Assembly met in the Frankfurter Paulskirche to discuss German unification and Prince William returned from London the following month. A year later, in 1849, he was appointed Governor-General of the Rhine Province and in the spring of 1850, he and Augusta took up residence in Koblenz.

Life in Koblenz

Augusta enjoyed life in Koblenz and it was here that she could finally live out court life as she was accustomed to during her childhood in Weimar. Meanwhile, their son Friedrich (Frederick) studied nearby in Bonn and became the first Prussian prince to receive an academic education.

Koblenz was subsequently visited by many liberal-minded contemporaries, including the historian Max Dunker and legal professors August von Bethmann-Hollweg, Clemens Theodor Pertes and Alexander von Schleinitz. Critically, Augusta's tolerance towards Catholicism at Koblenz (and throughout her lifetime) was scorned in Berlin and was felt inappropriate for a Prussian Protestant princess.

In 1856 Augusta and William's only daughter, Princess Louise (then 17 years old), married Frederick, Grand Duke of Baden, and in 1858 their son Frederick married Princess Victoria, the eldest child of Queen Victoria and Prince Albert. Augusta saw this as a personal triumph and hoped her new daughter-in-law's liberal upbringing, particularly under Prince Albert, in a modern country like the United Kingdom would guide Frederick in the direction of a liberal monarchy at home.

Return to Berlin
In 1858, William became Regent after his brother was no longer able to lead his government due to suffering several strokes. He and Augusta traveled to the court at Berlin.

William soon dismissed the old ministry when he succeeded his childless brother as king in 1861 and appointed liberal ministers of his own, notably from his own court at Koblenz, including: Alexander von Schleinitz, who became Foreign Secretary; August von Bethmann, who became Minister of Culture; and Karl Anton of Hohenzollern-Sigmaringen who became Minister President of Prussia. The conservative opponents saw this as the work of Augusta, but her political influence on William was rather small. This became evident a few months later when he dissolved parliament, which was not bending to his will. The King appointed Otto von Bismarck as the new Prussian Minister President. Augusta, now Queen, regarded Bismarck as her mortal enemy and Bismarck likewise despised Augusta for her (albeit small) influence on her husband.

Augusta was particularly horrified at Bismarck's foreign policy and his cause in the commencement of the Austro-Prussian War. At the same time, she became more and more estranged from the king and Bismarck began to comment negatively on the Queen in parliament; the Queen reacted by being rude to Bismarck's wife, Johanna.

The Queen soon began to suffer from her manic-depressive phases again and started making frequent trips to Baden-Baden, in search of a cure. At this time, the Prussian population was rejoicing in the victory at Königgrätz, but Augusta began mourning for the dead and injured. Augusta also became estranged from her daughter-in-law, Victoria who, contrary to custom, inherited the former Queen Elisabeth's jewelleries, which were supposed to be left to Augusta. 

Augusta, who clearly abhorred war, founded the National Women's Association in 1864, which looked after wounded and ill soldiers and convened with Florence Nightingale for ideas. Several hospital foundations exist today from Augusta's initiative, including the German Society of Surgery. Augusta was an avid supporter of the Red Cross movement, and the Augusta Fund at the International Committee of the Red Cross still exists today.
She was also suspected of having been a secret Catholic by many members of the prussian court. Her daughter-in-law Victoria wrote in a letter to her mother Queen Victoria stating that Augusta "has a great leaning towards the Roman Catholic religion", during the wars of the risorgimento Augusta was interested in preserving the temporal powers of the Pope which brought her into conflict with the Chancellor Otto Von Bismark who would later go on to organize the Kulturkampf

German Empress

The Austro-Prussian War soon ended in 1866 but four years later, the Franco-Prussian War started in 1870 and Augusta continued to hold Bismarck personally responsible. However, the aftermath of the war left William as German Emperor and Augusta as German Empress.

Augusta felt the Imperial Crown a personal defeat; she wanted the Prussian supremacy in Germany to succeed by "moral conquest" and not by bloodshed. Her opinion of the war was established by erecting an educational establishment in Potsdam in 1872, as "a home for the education of destitute daughters of German officers, military officials, priests and doctors from the field of honour as a result of the war of 1870–71."

Augusta buried her differences with Bismarck only after the war, as it seemed he was the only suitable man to support her beloved grandson, Wilhelm (William). However, the younger Wilhelm disliked Bismarck and soon forced him to resign during the first few years of his own reign.

Last years
Augusta had suffered from rheumatism for many years and in June 1881, she received heavy injuries from a fall which left her dependent on crutches and a wheelchair, but this did not hinder her from fulfilling her duties.

She also renewed her vows with her husband on his 90th birthday in 1887, but he died a year later. Only 99 days later, her son, who had succeeded to the throne as Frederick III, succumbed to cancer of the larynx. Seeing her beloved grandson Wilhelm become king and emperor that year, she died over a year later on 7 January 1890, aged 78, at the Altes Palais Unter den Linden during the 1889–1890 flu pandemic. Augusta was buried in the Schloss Charlottenburg beside her husband.

Honours
  Kingdom of Prussia:
 Dame of the Black Eagle, with Collar, 18 October 1861
 Dame of the Order of Louise, 1st Division
 Cross of Merit for Women and Girls, 9 April 1871
 : Dame of the Order of Queen Saint Isabel
 : Grand Cross of St. Catherine, in Diamonds, 12 December 1811
 : Dame of the Order of Queen Maria Luisa, 20 May 1863
  Mexican Empire: Grand Cross of St. Charles, 10 April 1865
 : Dame of the Order of Sidonia, 1871

Eponyms
Among others, the following were named for her:
 The steam corvette , built in the 1860s.
 The protected cruiser SMS Kaiserin Augusta, built by the German Navy in the year of her death.
 Kaiserin-Augusta-Straße in Berlin and the Berlin U-Bahn station in that street. 
 The Kaiserin Augusta Gymnasium, founded in 1818 and named for her in 1876.

Ancestry

References

 Karin Feuerstein-Praßer; Die deutschen Kaiserinnen 1871–1918, Regensburg 1997, 
 Wilhelm Treue (Hsg); Drei Deutsche Kaiser – Ihr Leben und Ihre Zeit 1858–1918, Verlag Ploetz, Würzburg 1987,

External links

 Monument of the empress Augusta in Baden-Baden
 Biography of Empress Augusta

1811 births
1890 deaths
German empresses
Burials at the Charlottenburg Palace Park Mausoleum, Berlin
Dames of the Order of Saint Isabel
Nobility from Weimar
Duchesses of Saxe-Lauenburg
Princesses of Saxe-Weimar-Eisenach
Prussian princesses
Prussian royal consorts
Queen mothers
Daughters of monarchs